Porto-Vecchio (or  ;   or ) is a commune in the French department of Corse-du-Sud, on the island of Corsica.

Porto-Vecchio is a medium-sized port city placed on a good harbor, the southernmost of the marshy and alluvial east side of Corsica. It is the seat of two cantons: Bavella and Grand Sud.

Geography
The north shore of the gulf has many resorts, such as Benedettu, Marina di Fiori, and others of the commune of Lecci. The east coast, a shore with cliffs, is less habitable; beyond Chiappa Point (a naturist site) the coast goes southwest to the border of Bonifacio commune.

Hills to the northwest are included in the national park; the village of Ospedale there probably takes its name and origin from a large ancient hospital of the Roman era. It never lost that function but continues as a health center employing about 150 people. Nearby is a reservoir, the Lac de l'Ospedale, created with a dam at the foot of punta di Corbu in the forest of Ospedale. These hills culminate at the  "peak of the dead cow" (punta di a Vacca Morta).

Climate
Porto-Vecchio has a hot-summer mediterranean climate (Köppen climate classification Csa).

Demographics

Ecology

The heights of Ospedale (or Spedale in earlier literature) are noted for their forest of Corsican Pine. Between them and the coast extends a plain drained by the Stabacciu, which flows into the end of the Gulf of Porto through salt marshes, where Cork Oak and Eucalyptus grow. These marshes were a barrier between the Roman settlements along the Via Corsicana of the eastern plain and the Roman ports of the south. Some marshland was filled to make the modern city and commercial salt pans were constructed on other parts (from which the commercialized slogan "city of salt"); the rest remains. Crossed by Highway N198 south, it is no longer a barrier.

Facilities
It has a public high school and two community colleges, a private hospital of 107 beds, a medical school, a cork industry and extensive tourist facilities. The port includes moorings for 450 small craft, commercial facilities and a ferry station. The population expands to 50,000 in the summer, predominantly Italian. The beaches are well-populated, especially Palombaggia Beach  to the south-east. In 1983 it acquired a Film Institute, which organizes an annual film festival.

Politics
List of recent mayors:
 Since March 2004 Georges Mela
 1997–2004 Camille de Rocca Serra (UMP)
 –1997 Jean-Paul de Rocca Serra (RPR)

Prehistory

To the north of the commune is to be found the prehistoric site of Torré, which has given its name to the Torréen Culture. Dated to the Corsican Bronze Age, it features circular or semi-circular (abutting) citadels of stone.

In the direction of Figari, the hamlet of Ceccia also has prehistoric remains, and not far away is another Torréen site, Castellu di Tappa.

West of the commune is the prehistoric site of Tivulaghju.

History
Porto-Vecchio is placed in a region that in earlier times was marshy and suffered greatly from malaria; however, the anchorage for a port is excellent. The name means "Old Port", which may refer to the Roman port that left traces in the vicinity. Subsequently, the region was more or less abandoned because of the malarial marshes but became part of a large Christian parish. The city was refounded in 1539 by the Bank of Saint George at Genoa on a  hill overlooking the gulf. They already had a presence in Bastia.

The Genoese were careful to preserve the Roman port within the walls, which are trapezoidal and enclose the main square, place de la République, near the church, Église St.-Jean Baptiste. The Genoese intended a colonia, or replacement of the population, but malaria soon killed most of the Genoese settlers. Another colony in 1546 suffered the same fate and subsequently the colony became a conurbation instead.

Sempiero Corso occupied the city for a few months in 1564.

Some of the population began to return with the drainage projects instituted under the Second Empire, but they were minimally successful. World War II brought the presence of allies who were determined to eradicate malaria for the health of all concerned, but especially the soldiers and airmen. Through drainage, filling and spraying they succeeded, making the region newly attractive because less pestilential. The current population derives from an expansion that started about 1950.

Transport 

This town is a terminus of a branch line of the now closed metre gauge Corsican Railways, which junctioned off the main system at Casamozza.

Gallery

See also 
 Former railway station

References

External links

 

 Porto-Vecchio Corsica Independent travel guide to the stylish town of Porto-Vecchio Corsica. 

Communes of Corse-du-Sud
Corse-du-Sud communes articles needing translation from French Wikipedia